Taurus Zentrum is a shopping mall under construction in Thiruvananthapuram, Kerala, India. The mall is owned and managed by Taurus Investment Holdings. The Mall is designed by the international architectural firm, Benoy. The shopping mall is located near National Highway 66 at Technopark Phase III. The mall will have Kerala's largest multiplex and first Megaplex with 15 screens by Cinépolis. The mall will also have both  IMAX and 4DX screens .

History
Taurus Zentrum is part of the Taurus Downtown Trivandrum project by Taurus Investment Holdings at Technopark. The proposal had come up in the Emerging Kerala investors summit held by the Government of Kerala in 2012. The framework agreement was signed in September 2015 and the project started construction in October 2018.

Description and Features
The mall will have Kerala's largest multiplex and first Megaplex with 15 screens by Cinépolis. The mall will also have both IMAX and 4DX screens.

This mall has a digital user experience system and parking spaces for more than 2000 cars.

See also
 Mall of Travancore
 Lulu Mall, Thiruvananthapuram
 Reliance Centro Mall, Thiruvananthapuram

References

External links
 Downtown Trivandrum
 Taurus Investment Holdings - India 
 Taurus Investment Holdings, LLC

Shopping malls in Thiruvananthapuram
Buildings and structures under construction in India